Monteaven, previously named Shahumyani Trchnafabrika (translates as "Shahumyan poultry factory") is a municipality in the Armavir Province of Armenia.

See also 
Armavir Province

References

 
 

Populated places in Armavir Province